Laon is a city in Picardie in northern France.

Laon may also refer to:

 12279 Laon, a main-belt asteroid
 US Laon, a French association football team
 Laon, the title character of the Manhwa Laon
 Laon, a Korean manhwa by YoungBin Kim and Hyun You.

See also

 Loan (disambiguation)
 Laona, New York